Nanakwas is a village in Mahendragarh district, Haryana, India.

Climate
Generally the climate is dry, with 461 mm of precipitation annually. It is hot in summer and cold in winter. The Köppen climate classification is BSh. The average annual temperature is 25.1 °C. The warmest month is June, with an average temperature of 34.1 °C. The coldest month is January, when the average temperature is 14.4 °C.

Water quality
EC Value in Micro Mhos/Cm is above 6000.

Nearby places
 Kothal Kalan
 Deroli Jat
 Atali
 Kothal Khurd
 Deroli Ahir
 Khatiwas
 Dulot
 Bhalkhi
 Sihma
 Dongra Ahir

References 

Villages in Mahendragarh district